Jack Marie Henry David Bowles is a French businessman, and the chief executive (CEO) of British American Tobacco (BAT), the world's second largest tobacco company by sales, since April 2019.

Bowles was born in France. He was educated at IPAG Business School, Paris, France.

Bowles joined BAT in 2004 as head of their French business and later became head of the Malaysian business, before becoming chief operating officer (COO) in 2017.

In September 2018, it was announced that Bowles would succeed Nicandro Durante as CEO from April 2019.

Bowles is married, with three children. He is a keen scuba diver.

References

Living people
French chief executives
British American Tobacco people
Chief operating officers
Chief executive officers 
Year of birth missing (living people)
1960s births